Yan Fu (courtesy name: Ji Dao, ; 8 January 1854 — 27 October  1921) was a Chinese military officer, newspaper editor, translator, and writer. He was most famous for introducing western ideas, including Darwin's "natural selection", to China in the late 19th century.

Life
On January 8, 1854, Yan Fu was born in what is modern-day Fuzhou, Fujian Province to a respectable scholar-gentry family in the trade of Chinese medicine. In his early years, Yan Fu’s father greatly encouraged Yan Fu to obtain a high level of education and prepare for the Imperial examination. However, the death of his father in 1866 caused an abrupt change to these plans. A year later, Yan Fu entered the Foochow Arsenal Academy in Fuzhou, a Western school where he studied a variety of subjects including English, arithmetic, geometry, algebra, trigonometry, physics, chemistry, astrology and navigation. This was a turning point in young Yan Fu’s life as he was able to experience the first-hand contact with Western science, thus inspiring the enthusiasm that carried him through the rest of his career.

After graduating with high honors in 1871, Yan Fu went on to spend the next five years at sea. He first served aboard the training ship Jianwei and later on the battlecruiser Yangwu. In 1877–79 he studied at the Royal Naval College, Greenwich, England. During his years there, he became acquainted with China’s first ambassador Guo Songtao, and despite their age difference and status gap developed a strong friendship. Benjamin Schwartz mentions in his biography that "they often spent whole days and nights discussing differences and similarities in Chinese and Western thought and political institutions".

His return to China, however, did not bring him the immediate success he was hoping for.  Though he was unable to pass the Imperial Civil Service Examination, he was able to obtain a teaching position at the Foochow Arsenal Academy and then Beiyang Naval Officers' School at Tianjin. During this time, Yan Fu succumbed to the opium addiction that had sprung up in China.
 
It was not until after the Chinese defeat in the First Sino-Japanese War (1894–95, fought for control of Korea) that Yan Fu became famous. He is celebrated for his translations, including Thomas Huxley's Evolution and Ethics, Adam Smith's The Wealth of Nations, John Stuart Mill's On Liberty and Herbert Spencer's Study of Sociology. Yan critiqued the ideas of Darwin and others, offering his own interpretations. The ideas of "natural selection" and "survival of the fittest" were introduced to Chinese readers through Huxley's work. The former idea was famously rendered by Yan Fu into Chinese as tiānzé.

Yan Fu served as an editor of the newspaper Guowen Bao. He became politically active, and in 1895, he was involved in the Gongche Shangshu movement, which opposed the Treaty of Shimonoseki ending the First Sino-Japanese War. In 1909 he was given an honorary Jinshi degree. In 1912 he became the first principal of National Peking University (now Peking University). Today the university holds an annual academic conference in his honor.

He became a royalist and conservative who supported Yuan Shikai and Zhang Xun to proclaim themselves emperor in his later life. He also participated in the foundation of Chouanhui, an organization that supported restoring monarchy. He laughed at "New Literature Revolutionaries" such as Hu Shih.

On October 27, 1921, after returning to his home in Fuzhou only a year earlier to recuperate from his recurring asthma, Yan Fu died at the age of 67.

Translation theory

Yan stated in the preface  to his translation of Evolution and Ethics that "there are three difficulties in translation: faithfulness, expressiveness, and elegance". He did not set them as general standards for translation and did not say that they were independent of each other. However, since the publication of that work, the phrase "faithfulness, expressiveness, and elegance" has been attributed to Yan Fu as a standard for any good translation and has become a cliché in Chinese academic circles, giving rise to numerous debates and theses. Some scholars argue that this dictum actually derived from Scottish theoretician of translation, Alexander Fraser Tytler.

Though Yan Fu's classical prose did its best to meet the standards of "faithfulness, expressiveness, and elegance", there were those who criticized his works for not being accessible to the younger generations. In particular, a famous liberal from the May Fourth Movement, Cai Yuanpei, stated in an article written in 1924: "...[Yan Fu's translations]...seem to be old-fashioned and his literary style is difficult to comprehend, but the standard with which he selected books and the way he translated them are very admirable even today". Other critiques of his work arose as Chinese scholars became more aware of Western learning.

Translated works

Yan Fu was one of the most influential scholars of his generation as he worked to introduce Western social, economic and political ideas to China. Previous translation efforts had been focused mainly on religion and technology. Yan Fu was also one of the first scholars to have personal experiences in Western culture, whereas many prior scholars were students in Japan who then translated Western works from Japanese to Chinese. Yan Fu also played an important role in the standardization of science terminology in China during his time serving as the Head of the State Terminology Bureau.

In 1895 he published Zhibao , a Chinese newspaper founded in Tianjin by the German Constantin von Hannecken (1854-1925), which contains several of his most famous essays:
Lun shi bian zhi ji  (On the Speed of World Change)
Yuan qiang  (On the Origin of Strength)
Pi Han  (In Refutation of Han Yu)
Jiuwang jue lun  (On our Salvation)

Later, from 1898 to 1909, Yan Fu went on to translate the following major works of Western liberal thought:
Evolution and Ethics Thomas Henry Huxley as Tianyan lun  (On Evolution) 1896-1898
The Wealth of Nations by Adam Smith as Yuan fu  (On Wealth) 1901
The Study of Sociology by Herbert Spencer as Qunxue yiyan  (A Study of Sociology) 1903 
On Liberty by John Stuart Mill as Qunji quanjie lun  (On the Boundary between the Self and the Group) 1903 
A System of Logic by John Stuart Mill as Mule mingxue   (Mill’s Logic) 1903 
A History of Politics by Edward Jenks as Shehui tongquan  (A Full Account of Society) 1903
The Spirit of the Laws by Montesquieu as Fayi   (The Meaning of the Laws) 1904-1909
Primer of Logic by William Stanley Jevons as Mingxue qianshuo  (An Outline of Logic) 1909

See also

Translation

References

Benjamin I. Schwartz (1964). In Search of Wealth and Power: Yen Fu and the West. Cambridge: Belknap Press of Harvard University Press.
 Shen Suru  (1998). Lun Xin Da Ya: Yan Fu Fanyi Lilun Yanjiu ( "On faithfulness, understandability and elegance: a study of Yan Fu's translation theory"). Beijing: Commercial Press.
Wang, Frederic (2009). “The Relationship between Chinese Learning and Western Learning according to Yan Fu (1845-1921).” Knowledge and Society Today (Multiple Modernity Project) Lyon, France.

Notes

External links

 Detailed biography and with related essays
  Some of his works on-line, including the translation of Evolution and Ethics

1854 births
1921 deaths
Chinese military officers
Chinese monarchists
Chinese newspaper editors
Chinese scholars
Deaths from asthma
Educators from Fujian
English–Chinese translators
Academic staff of Fudan University
Graduates of the Royal Naval College, Greenwich
Academic staff of Peking University
Presidents of Fudan University
Presidents of Peking University
Qing dynasty translators
Republic of China translators
Translation scholars
Writers from Fuzhou